Cottage Lawn is a historic home located at Oneida in Madison County, New York.  It is a Gothic Revival style cottage designed by Alexander Jackson Davis and built in 1849.  It is a two-story "L" shaped house, with basement and attic.  It is constructed of brick and coated in stucco.  It features six quatrefoil columns that support Tudor arches spanning the verandah.

It was added to the National Register of Historic Places in 1980.

The Madison County Historical Society operates the house as the Cottage Lawn Museum, featuring Victorian period rooms and local history displays.

References

External links
 Madison County Historical Society

Houses on the National Register of Historic Places in New York (state)
Gothic Revival architecture in New York (state)
Houses completed in 1849
Houses in Madison County, New York
Museums in Madison County, New York
Historic house museums in New York (state)
Historical society museums in New York (state)
1849 establishments in New York (state)
National Register of Historic Places in Madison County, New York